The 1948 Cincinnati Bearcats football team was an American football team that represented the University of Cincinnati as a member of the Mid-American Conference (MAC) during the 1948 college football season. The Bearcats were led by head coach Ray Nolting and compiled a 3–6–1 record.

Schedule

References

Cincinnati
Cincinnati Bearcats football seasons
Cincinnati Bearcats football